The Sacrament is a 1989 Belgian comedy film directed by Belgian author Hugo Claus. It was screened in the Un Certain Regard section at the 1990 Cannes Film Festival. The film is based on Claus' own novel Omtrent Deedee and his play Interieur. The film was selected as the Belgian entry for the Best Foreign Language Film at the 62nd Academy Awards, but was not accepted as a nominee.

Plot
The 1950s. A family has its annual family reunion to commemorate the anniversary of mother's death. People drink and eat heavily and after a while all restrictions are lost. Family members start venting old frustrations, discussions and tensions. Eventually one homosexual young man gets depressed and a drama escalates.

Cast
 Ann Petersen as Natalie
 Carl Ridders as Claude
 Jan Decleir as Albert
 Hugo Van Den Berghe as Antoine
 An De Donder as Jeanne
 Marc Didden as Gigi
 Chris Lomme as Lotte
 Brit Alen as Tilly
 Linda Schagen Van Leeuwen as Lutje
 Blanka Heirman as Taatje
 Koen Crucke
 Frank Aendenboom as Dee Dee, the priest (uncredited)

See also
 List of submissions to the 62nd Academy Awards for Best Foreign Language Film
 List of Belgian submissions for the Academy Award for Best Foreign Language Film

References

External links

1989 films
1989 comedy films
1989 drama films
1980s historical comedy-drama films
Belgian comedy-drama films
Belgian historical comedy films
Films based on works by Hugo Claus
Belgian LGBT-related films
Belgian films based on plays
Films scored by Frédéric Devreese
Films shot in Belgium
Films set in Belgium
1980s Dutch-language films
Films directed by Hugo Claus
Films based on multiple works
Films set in the 1950s
Dutch-language Belgian films